The Marie Byrd Land Volcanic Province is a volcanic field in northern Marie Byrd Land of West Antarctica, consisting of over 18 large shield volcanoes, 30 small volcanic centres and possibly many more centres buried under the West Antarctic Ice Sheet.

Volcanism in the Marie Byrd Land Volcanic Province commenced at least 36 million years ago during the latest Eocene epoch. This activity has continued into the current Holocene epoch, with the largest volcanic eruption in the last 10,000 years having possibly taken place about 2,300 years ago.

Volcanoes

Ames Range
Mount Andrus
Mount Boennighausen
Mount Kauffman
Mount Kosciusko
Crary Mountains
Boyd Ridge
Mount Frakes
Mount Steere
Mount Rees
Executive Committee Range
Mount Cumming
Mount Hampton
Mount Hartigan
Mount Sidley
Mount Waesche
Flood Range
Mount Berlin
Mount Bursey
Starbuck Crater
Mount Moulton
McCuddin Mountains
Mount Petras
Mount Flint
Mount Murphy
Mount Siple
Mount Takahe
Toney Mountain
Downs Cone
Ellis Cone

References

Geologic provinces
Volcanoes of Marie Byrd Land
Eocene volcanoes
Oligocene volcanoes
Miocene volcanoes
Pliocene volcanoes
Pleistocene volcanoes
Holocene volcanoes
Volcanic fields